Skyline Alternate School is a public alternate high school program in Williams Lake in the Canadian province of British Columbia. The school is administered as part of School District 27 Cariboo-Chilcotin. The principal is Michael Franklin.

The Skyline program provides an alternative education intervention provision for more vulnerable students. This includes a secondary transition program for students in grades 8 to 12.

References

High schools in British Columbia
Educational institutions in Canada with year of establishment missing